Delio Onnis (born 24 March 1948) is a former professional football player who played as striker. Born in Italy, his family emigrated to Argentina in his youth and he was nicknamed "El Tano" (the Italian) in Argentina.

With 299 goals, he is the all-time top highest goalscorer in the history of Ligue 1 in France, and was the league's top scorer on five different occasions. He played the majority of his career for Stade de Reims, AS Monaco, Tours FC and Sporting Toulon Var. With Monaco he won one league title and one Coupe de France.

Career
Onnis was born in Giuliano di Roma in Italy, but moved to Argentina before he was 3 and subsequently gained Argentinian citizenship. Beginning his football career as a youth player for Club Almagro, he made a successful transition to the senior team and subsequently earned a move to Gimnasia La Plata where he played alongside players like Roberto Zywica. He was the star striker for the team that finished third in 1970 which brought him to the attention of scouts from Europe.

In 1971 he joined Stade de Reims at the same time as his compatriot Zywica, finishing his first season with 22 goals and his second season with 17. In 1974 the newly promoted AS Monaco signed him and over the next 7 seasons he was their top scorer every year, eventually scoring 223 goals, with 157 in the league. In 1976 the club were relegated, but Onnis stayed with them and helped them regain their top flight status for the 1977-78 season that saw them finish as league champions, and the following season win the Coupe de France.

In 1980, despite playing in one of the best teams in Division 1, he signed for newly promoted and inexperienced team FC Tours, where he was twice again Division 1 leading goalscorer. In 1983 Tours were relegated, and as a result he joined SC Toulon, where he finished his career in 1986.

International career
Onnis was never called up for Argentina which had a policy of favouring players who remained in the domestic league, and throughout the 70s and 80s he, like Carlos Bianchi, was behind compatriots such as Mario Kempes and Leopoldo Luque in the Argentinian pecking order.

Scoring titles
Carlos Bianchi had been signed as his replacement at Reims in 1973–74. Bianchi went on to win five scoring titles over the next six seasons, including four back-to-back between 1975 and 1979, Onnis breaking Bianchi's run in 1974–75. Following Bianchi's return to Argentina in 1980, Onnis went on to win four back-to-back scoring titles of his own, leaving them with five apiece and meaning that in 11 seasons between 1973–74 and 1983–84 they won five scoring titles each with only Vahid Halilhodžić's win in 1982 for FC Nantes breaking their dominance.

Career statistics

Club

Honours
Monaco
 Division 1: 1977–78
 Division 2: 1976–77
 Coupe de France: 1979–80

Individual
 French Division 1 top scorer: 1974–75, 1979–80, 1980–81, 1981–82, 1983–84
French Division 2 top scorer: 1976–77

Records
 Ligue 1 all-time highest goalscorer: 299 goals

References

 
BDFA profile 
Monaco profile

Notes

1948 births
Living people
Italian emigrants to Argentina
Association football forwards
Argentine footballers
Argentine expatriate footballers
Club Almagro players
Club de Gimnasia y Esgrima La Plata footballers
Ligue 1 players
Ligue 2 players
Stade de Reims players
AS Monaco FC players
Expatriate footballers in France
Expatriate footballers in Monaco
Argentine expatriate sportspeople in France
Argentine expatriate sportspeople in Monaco
Tours FC players
SC Toulon players
Argentine football managers
SC Toulon managers
Paris FC managers
Expatriate football managers in France
Naturalized citizens of Argentina